Gandaki Rural Municipality (Nepali :गण्डकी गाँउपालिका) is a Gaunpalika in Gorkha District in Gandaki Province of Nepal. On 12 March 2017, the government of Nepal implemented a new local administrative structure, with the implementation of the new local administrative structure, VDCs have been replaced with municipal and Village Councils. Gandaki is one of these 753 local units.

Demographics
At the time of the 2011 Nepal census, Gandaki Rural Municipality had a population of 23,262. Of these, 75.8% spoke Nepali, 15.3% Magar, 5.5% Chepang, 2.5% Gurung, 0.6% Newar, 0.2% Urdu and 0.2% other languages as their first language.

In terms of ethnicity/caste, 19.2% were Magar, 18.7% Hill Brahmin, 13.2% Newar, 13.0% Chepang/Praja, 12.7% Gurung, 5.8% Sarki, 5.2% Chhetri, 4.5% Kami, 3.3% Damai/Dholi, 1.1% Brahmu/Baramo, 1.1% Gharti/Bhujel, 1.0% Majhi, 0.5% Musalman, 0.2% Kumal, 0.2% Sanyasi/Dasnami, 0.1% Tamang and 0.2% others.

In terms of religion, 85.6% were Hindu, 9.6% Buddhist, 2.4% Prakriti, 1.8% Christian, 0.5% Muslim and 0.1% others.

In terms of literacy, 65.5% could both read and write, 2.3% could read but not write and 32.2% could neither read nor write.

References 

Gorkha District
Gandaki Province
Rural municipalities of Nepal established in 2017
Rural municipalities in Gorkha District